Alverdiscott (pronounced Alscott,  or ) is a village, civil parish, former manor and former ecclesiastical parish in the Torridge district of Devon, England, centred  south-south-west of Barnstaple.

The population of the parish grew by five in the ten years to 2011, according to that year's census. The parish has three hamlets, Woodtown, Alverdiscott in the west, Alscott Barton describes part of the village nucleus and Stony Cross, Alverdiscott is in between these two places.

History
A Scheduled Ancient Monument is associated with the place, a Roman marching camp fort in the west of the area, on a former Iron Age enclosure. The church is built of granite with sloped slate roofs over the main body (nave) and squatter extension to the nave.  It has an archetypal Norman font, Norman doorway, tall tower and sixteenth-century pulpit and is a listed building architecturally in the middle category, grade II*.

The village has long lost pronunciation of its middle letters yet refused in the Victorian era to adjust its older spelling in favour of a more phonetic modern form except when describing "Alscott Barton", the former demesne of the manor.

The former Manor of Alverdiscott was here and within the parish is the historic estate of Webbery, listed in the Domesday Book as WIBERIE.

Transport

Roads
The B3232 skirts the nucleus of the village, the main road between Great Torrington and Barnstaple though not from the town to points east and west of Barnstaple being served by A-roads.

Railways

Economy
Alverdiscott has settled low unemployment, agriculture, home-working, commuting to Barnstaple and other towns across west Devon.  Seasonally the village generates recreational and tourism-derived income such as from holiday lodges, since the village is south of Barnstaple and east of a tall cliff-side part of the South West Coast Path, Westward Ho! beaches and within easy reach of visitor gardens and golf courses along the River Torridge.  An adventure activities centre is to the south at Southdown in the neighbouring parish of Huntshaw.

As of 2022, the connection of the proposed Xlinks Morocco-UK Power Project with the National Grid is planned to be at Alverdiscott.

See also
List of places in England with counterintuitive pronunciations: A–L

References

External links

 Devon Local Studies - Alverdiscott community page
 Alverdiscott at GENUKI
 

Villages in Devon
Roman fortifications in Devon
Roman fortified camps in England
Torridge District